Tipiqucha (Quechua tipi Pennisetum clandestinum (a grass species), tipiy to husk maize, to snap, to break, qucha lake, Hispanicized spelling Tipicocha) is a lake in Peru located in the Huancavelica Region, Huancavelica Province, Nuevo Occoro District. Tipiqucha lies in the southwestern part of the district, east of Sitaq.

See also
List of lakes in Peru

References

Lakes of Peru
Lakes of Huancavelica Region